is a subway station on the Tokyo Metro Hanzomon Line in Chūō, Tokyo, operated by the Tokyo subway operator Tokyo Metro. It is connected by moving walkways to the Tokyo City Air Terminal, and Ningyocho Station is located 500 meters to the east (although there is no transfer corridor between the two stations).

Lines
Suitengūmae Station is served by the Tokyo Metro Hanzōmon Line, and is numbered Z-10.

Station layout

History
Suitengūmae Station opened on 28 November 1990. It was the eastern terminus of the Hanzomon Line until 2003, when the line was extended to Oshiage Station.

The station facilities were inherited by Tokyo Metro after the privatization of the Teito Rapid Transit Authority (TRTA) in 2004.

Surrounding area
Ningyōchō Station (  and  ) (approximately 6 minutes' walk)

References

Railway stations in Tokyo
Tokyo Metro Hanzomon Line
Stations of Tokyo Metro
Railway stations in Japan opened in 1990
Nihonbashi, Tokyo